Bamunan is a 1990 drama film directed by Falaba Issa Traoré.

Synopsis
Daily life scenes in a rural village of Mali: harvest, meddlesomeness, children games, a wedding, a theft, and the clumsy intervention of the police. The character that brings all these scenes together is a leper despised by the whole village, who manages to be cured in the city and happily returns to his people.

Awards
 Best Actress (Mariatou Kouyaté) at FESPACO - Panafrican Film and Television Festival of Ouagadougou, Burkina Faso (1991)

See also
Falaba Issa Traoré 
Cinema of Mali
Bamunai

External links
Bamunan - IMDb page about Bamunan
Bamunan in the Africultures.
Bamunan in the Complete Index to World Film.

Malian drama films
1990 films